Belo is a town and commune in Northwest Region of Cameroon. It is mainly populated by Kom people.

History 
In April 2018, the town came under control of separatists fighting for the independence of Ambazonia. The Cameroonian Army later retook the town, which was depopulated due to the fighting.

See also

Communes of Cameroon

References

 Site de la primature - Élections municipales 2002 
 Contrôle de gestion et performance des services publics communaux des villes camerounaises - Thèse de Donation Avele, Université Montesquieu Bordeaux IV 
 Charles Nanga, La réforme de l’administration territoriale au Cameroun à la lumière de la loi constitutionnelle n° 96/06 du 18 janvier 1996, Mémoire ENA. 

Communes of Northwest Region (Cameroon)